The  command is a Unix program used to copy files and set file permissions.  Some implementations offer to invoke  while installing executable files.

The command is not defined in POSIX. It has mostly split into two camps in terms of compatibility, a GNU type and a BSD type. The command is available as a separate package for Microsoft Windows as part of the UnxUtils collection of native Win32 ports of common GNU Unix-like utilities.

References

External links 
 
 
 install in busybox and install in toybox (both GNU-like)

Unix file system-related software
Command-line software